A Woman With Power of Attorney (German: Ein Mädchen mit Prokura) is a 1934 German drama film directed by Arzén von Cserépy and starring Gerda Maurus, Ernst Dumcke, and Rolf von Goth. It was based on the 1932 novel of the same name by Christa Anita Brück.

Cast

References

External links

Films of Nazi Germany
German drama films
1934 drama films
Films based on German novels
German black-and-white films
Films directed by Arzén von Cserépy
1930s German films